VA-34 has the following meanings:
Attack Squadron 34 (U.S. Navy)
State Route 34 (Virginia)